Smuravyevo (Russian: Смуравьёво) (also Gdov or Smurav'yevo) is a former airbase of the Russian Air Force and former closed city in Pskov Oblast, Russia.

Location

History
The symbol of the town was a Mikoyan-Gurevich MiG-21, on a plinth, and the base was home to the 722nd Bomber Aviation Regiment (722 BAP) flying Sukhoi Su-24 aircraft. The 722nd Bomber Aviation Regiment was supervised by the 149th Mixed Aviation Division, also located at the base. It was part of the 76th Air Army during collapse of Soviet Union, and after a reorganisation in 1998, the 6th Air and Air Defence Forces Army until the town's closure. In 1994, many servicemen and pilots were resettled here from the units located previously in East Germany. The town's population at the time was about 4000 residents.

Circa 2010, the base was closed.

Closure of town and airport
Occurring during the 2008 reforms implemented by then defence minister Anatoliy Serdyukov, locals did not welcome the closure of the airport, as it left hundreds unemployed without suitable alternatives. The gas supply for residents was cut off and the town was left to crumble. Firewood is currently used but it is an outdated and expensive option, partially due to the condition of heating systems. 
In 2020, the head of local municipal services Aleksandr Moyseyev stated that the town's buildings have been completely worn out and half of the town's residents are military retirees. 

Also, the water systems are in bad shape – locals are already living without reliable water supply, and the local water tower has been nicknamed as "The leaning tower of Pisa". If the tower collapses, the town would also lose the water supply. As the water quality has already declined to the point where it is undrinkable, locals have been forced to get their drinking water from the spring located 1.5 km outside of the town in a village of Lyubimets.

The construction of a school in the area between the town's residential buildings and the airfield was halted when the military withdrew, leaving only 2 out of 3 floors of the school finished. Looters have been demolishing the building, and according to the local residents, the current state of the school has deteriorated to the point that it seems a suitable place to make a film about war in Syria or some other conflict.

References

Soviet Air Force bases
Soviet Frontal Aviation
Pskov Oblast
Russian Air Force bases